Belenenses is a Portuguese rugby union team. Apart from winning several titles as a team, they have also provided five players to the National Team that played at the 2007 Rugby World Cup finals. Their most recent title was the victory in the National Championship of the 2007/2008 season.

Honours
Campeonato Nacional Honra/Super Bock:
Winner (7): 1955/56, 1957/58, 1962/63, 1972/73, 1974/75, 2002/03, 2007/08, 2021/22
Portuguese Cup: 
Winner (3): 1959, 1964, 2001, 2022
Portuguese Super Cup:
Winners (3): 2001, 2003, 2005, 2022

Current squad

External links
Official site
C.F. Os Belenenses rugby section

C.F. Os Belenenses
Belenenses, C.F. Os
1928 establishments in Portugal